Kent Butcher (born 5 November 1973) is a former Australian rules footballer who played with Collingwood in the Australian Football League (AFL).

Butcher played both under-19s and reserves football for Geelong, but it was at Collingwood that he started his AFL career. In round eight of the 1994 season, the rebounding defender would receive a Rising Star nomination for his 20 disposal game against St Kilda on the Melbourne Cricket Ground.

An injury brought an end to his time at Collingwood and he was delisted, and was picked up by the Sydney Swans with the seventh selection of the 1996 Pre-season draft. He didn't play a senior AFL game for the Swans.

Butcher, a former Grovedale player, would move back to Geelong, where he played and coached.

References

External links
 
 

1973 births
Australian rules footballers from Victoria (Australia)
Collingwood Football Club players
Grovedale Football Club players
Living people